Hollywood station may refer to multiple stations:

United States
In Los Angeles, California
 Hollywood/Highland station, rapid transit station in Los Angeles, California
 Hollywood/Vine station, rapid transit station in Los Angeles, California
 Hollywood/Western station, rapid transit station in Los Angeles, California

Elsewhere in the United States
 Hollywood station (Florida), train station in Hollywood, Florida
 Hollywood station (Illinois), Metra station in Brookfield, Illinois
 Hollywood/Northeast 42nd Avenue Transit Center, bus and light rail station in the Hollywood District of Portland, Oregon

United Kingdom
 Holywood railway station (Northern Ireland), in County Down, Northern Ireland
 Holywood railway station (Scotland), a disused station in Dumfries and Galloway, Scotland

See also 
 Hollywood (disambiguation)